Medway River may refer to:
 
 Medway River (Tasmania), Australia, a river of Tasmania
 Medway River, Nova Scotia, Canada
 Medway River, New Zealand
 Medway River (Georgia), United States

See also 
 River Medway, England
 River Medway (drag queen)
 Medway Creek (Ontario), Canada
 Medway (disambiguation)
 Midway River